The phin is a type of lute with a pear-shaped body, originating in the Isan region of Thailand and played mostly by ethnic Laotians in Thailand and Laos. It has frets on the neck over which two or three metal strings run that are plucked by a pick held in the right hand while playing. It is often played together with the khene mouth organ.

See also 
 Thai music

References

External links
Video youtube - phin performance
Phin sound example

Thai musical instruments
Laotian musical instruments